Tamil Nadu State Highway 6 (SH-6) connects Kallakurichi with Thiruvannamalai in Tamil Nadu state, India.

SH-6 Kallakurichi- Sankarapuram
-Thiruvannamalai

State highways in Tamil Nadu